The True Light Middle School of Hong Kong (TLMSHK) is a well-known girls' school located at Tai Hang, Hong Kong Island. The school consists of a secondary, a primary and a kindergarten section, located at the same premises. While the secondary section is a girls' school, the primary and kindergarten sections are co-educational. It is classified as a Band 1 school. The secondary section adopted cheongsam as the school uniform, a legendary fitted dress in Chinese culture.

History 
True Light Seminary, the original name of TLMSHK, was the first women's school established in Guangzhou, South China in 1872 by Ms Harriet Newell Noyes, a missionary from the American Presbyterian Church. 

"Thou Art the Light of the World" was chosen as the school motto. Six students were enrolled. It was the pioneer of Chinese women's education in Southern China. The women's education that it advocates not only raised the status of women in society but also helped nurture the talents needed by the country and made a great contribution to the overall development of society.

The school's expansion was first initiated in 1878 due to a fire incident. Since then, the school opened its primary section, the Women's School and the Bible Women’s Training School. The number of students have significantly increased to 300 in 1916. 

In 1917, The Women's School and the Bible Women's Training School were merged and renamed as "True Light Middle School". The first graduation ceremony was held for the six graduates in 1919. 

In 1935, True Light Primary School was established in Hong Kong. The secondary section was added in the post-war period. 

The school was relocated to Tai Hang Road in 1951. The True Light Middle School of Hong Kong has then expanded to encompass 3 sections: a kindergarten, a primary school and a secondary school with a total enrollment of approximately 2,000 students.

The iconic school foundation, was built in 1966 for aesthetic appreciation. The school's swimming pool, was constructed in 1972. The swimming pool was then upgraded as an indoor heated pool in 2013.

Structure 
Secondary Section

 Aided 
 Girls' school

There are 24 classes ranging from S.1 to S.6

Primary & Kindergarten Section

 Private
 Co-educational school

School Motto
「爾乃世之光」 “Thou art the Light of the World”
The motto of the school was derived from the Chinese translation of the biblical phrase: 'Thou art the Light of the World' (爾乃世之光) (Matthew 5:14).

Logo 

 The star of Bethlehem

Location and Facilities 

The school is located on 50 Tai Hang Road, Hong Kong. Together with the private primary and kindergarten sections.

Facilities in the secondary school include the following:

 an all-weather sports ground, an indoor heated  swimming pool, an indoor gymnasium, a dancing room;
 an air-conditioned school hall, a True Light Chapel, a school history room, a conference room, three counseling rooms, a career master's room, two student activity rooms, a religious activity room, a staff resources centre;
 a library, a Readers’ Café, a K-zone (English centre), a multi-media learning centre;
 36 classrooms, four laboratories, two computer rooms, seven special-purpose rooms;
a music room

Source:

Form Associations & their representative colours 

 Yi Yun Association - Blue and white
 Xu Jing Association - Red and white
 Xiao Association - Green and white
 Heng Pu Association - Blue and white
 Chen Hui Association - Red and white
 Yao Association - Green and white

Notable alumni 
May Lo, Hong Kong actress; wife of famous singer Jacky Cheung
Charlene Tse, Hong Kong actress
Amy Cheung Siu Han, Chinese novelist
Lillian Lee, Chinese novelist
Ho Kim Fai, Hong Kong rower and sprint canoer

Principals

Notable faculty 
Yau Tsit Law, teacher, principal from 1928 to 1930

See also
Kowloon True Light School
Hong Kong True Light College
True Light Girls' College
Education in Hong Kong
List of secondary schools in Hong Kong

References

External links

 

Protestant secondary schools in Hong Kong
Primary schools in Hong Kong
Girls' schools in Hong Kong
Wan Chai District